Roy Harris (born 29 June 1933) is an American lawyer and retired heavyweight boxer, whose nickname derived from his place of birth, Cut and Shoot, Texas. Roy is a co-trainer of title contender Alfonso López III.

Early life
Harris was born in Cut and Shoot, Texas, on 29 June 1933. His father, a lifelong hog farmer, taught him how to box and wrestle. Following his four Golden Gloves championship victories, he enrolled in Sam Houston State University, excelling as an honor student, before joining the United States Army. He rose to the rank of Captain and served in the reserves for another 12 years.

Amateur career
Roy and his brother Henry took up the boxing together after receiving their first set of gloves in a trade for wild ducks. Roy was a four-time Texas Golden Gloves amateur champion, won his state Olympic Trials in 1952, and was the winner of the Joe Louis Sportsmanship Award at the 1954 National Golden Gloves.

Professional career
Roy was a heavyweight contender during the 1950s. He won his first 23 fights, including consecutive wins against Willi Besmanoff, Bob Baker and Willie Pastrano, and was named Ring Magazine's progress of the year for 1957.

World Heavyweight Championship
Before the bout, Roy was on the cover of Sports Illustrated. In August 1958, he was given a title shot by world champion Floyd Patterson. Patterson had trouble obtaining title defenses, as boxing at the time was controlled by organisations that Patterson and his manager, Cus D'Amato, refused to cooperate with.

The promotion was colorful, due to the backstory of Roy's kinsmen, one of the celebrated East Texas clans still existing as their forebears had for generations. Much was made of the "backwoods" quality of Roy's life, and every venue was utilized in using this as ballyhoo; this extended as far as having Roy record a 45 RPM record entitled "Cut 'n Shoot (Texas, U.S.A.)" (b/w "Desert in the Sky", Decca Records 9-30717). Roy was predictably photographed in cowboy hat and boots, and in one wire photo, he holds a revolver at the ready (AP Wirephoto rw41500sh). The aforementioned Sports Illustrated cover portrayed him barechested and barefoot, standing upon a cabin porch with 19th Century rifle at rest beside him; he further sports a canine companion. To watch the fight in Texas, Roy's extended family gathered at the drive-in theater in nearby Conroe, which was equipped for the occasion with its own closed circuit movie hook-up.

The fight took place at Wrigley Field, Los Angeles, CA. Roy knocked down the champion in the second round, but was himself knocked down four times; his corner stopped the fight before the 13th round. Mushy Callahan was the referee.

When questioned, Harris - a former winner of the Joe Louis Sportsman Award - simply said: "I did my best."

Harris subsequently won six consecutive fights, before being stopped 2:35 into his bout with Sonny Liston. He then dropped a decision to Henry Cooper and was stopped twice by Bob Cleroux.

Retirement
He retired with a final record of 30 wins and five losses. He is believed to be the only boxer to become a lawyer after fighting for the world heavyweight title. Roy Harris was a county clerk in Montgomery County for 28 years. He began practicing law in 1972 and drew up the papers for Cut And Shoot to become incorporated. Roy's office is based in his home and he has been married 47 years and has six children.

Professional boxing record

|-
| style="text-align:center;" colspan="8"|30 Wins (9 knockouts, 20 decisions, 1 DQ), 5 Losses (4 knockouts, 1 decision), 1 No Contest 
|-  style="text-align:center; background:#e3e3e3;"
|  style="border-style:none none solid solid; "|Result
|  style="border-style:none none solid solid; "|Record
|  style="border-style:none none solid solid; "|Opponent
|  style="border-style:none none solid solid; "|Type
|  style="border-style:none none solid solid; "|Round
|  style="border-style:none none solid solid; "|Date
|  style="border-style:none none solid solid; "|Location
|  style="border-style:none none solid solid; "|Notes
|- align=center
|Loss
|
|align=left| Bob Cleroux
|TKO
|4
|23/05/1961
|align=left| Sam Houston Coliseum, Houston, Texas
|align=left|
|-
|Win
|
|align=left| Dave Rent
|DQ
|5
|28/02/1961
|align=left| Houston, Texas
|align=left|
|-
|Loss
|
|align=left| Henry Cooper
|PTS
|10
|13/09/1960
|align=left| Empire Pool, Wembley, London
|align=left|
|-
|Loss
|
|align=left| Bob Cleroux
|KO
|5
|27/07/1960
|align=left| Delorimier Stadium, Montreal, Quebec
|align=left|
|-
|Loss
|
|align=left| Sonny Liston
|TKO
|1
|25/04/1960
|align=left| Sam Houston Coliseum, Houston, Texas
|align=left|
|-
|Win
|
|align=left| Henry Hall
|UD
|7
|21/03/1960
|align=left| Dallas Memorial Auditorium, Dallas, Texas
|align=left|
|-
|Win
|
|align=left| Alejandro Lavorante
|UD
|10
|24/11/1959
|align=left| San Antonio Municipal Auditorium, San Antonio, Texas
|align=left|
|-
|Win
|
|align=left| Joe Bygraves
|UD
|10
|25/08/1959
|align=left| Sam Houston Coliseum, Houston, Texas
|align=left|
|-
|Win
|
|align=left| Chuck Powell
|UD
|10
|09/06/1959
|align=left| Houston, Texas
|align=left|
|-
|Win
|
|align=left| Donnie Fleeman
|UD
|12
|01/04/1959
|align=left| Dallas Memorial Auditorium, Dallas, Texas
|align=left|
|-
|No Contest
|
|align=left| John Hunt
|NC
|5
|03/02/1959
|align=left| El Paso County Coliseum, El Paso, Texas
|align=left|
|-
|Win
|
|align=left| Donnie Fleeman
|UD
|12
|01/12/1958
|align=left| Dallas Memorial Auditorium, Dallas, Texas
|align=left|
|-
|Loss
|
|align=left| Floyd Patterson
|RTD
|12
|18/08/1958
|align=left| Wrigley Field, Los Angeles, California
|align=left|
|-
|Win
|
|align=left| Willi Besmanoff
|UD
|10
|29/10/1957
|align=left| Sam Houston Coliseum, Houston, Texas
|align=left|
|-
|Win
|
|align=left| Willie Pastrano
|UD
|10
|11/06/1957
|align=left| Houston, Texas
|align=left|
|-
|Win
|
|align=left| Bob "The Grinder" Baker
|MD
|10
|30/04/1957
|align=left| Sam Houston Coliseum, Houston, Texas
|align=left|
|-
|Win
|
|align=left| Joey Rowan
|PTS
|10
|26/02/1957
|align=left| Houston City Auditorium, Houston, Texas
|align=left|
|-
|Win
|
|align=left| Claude Chapman
|TKO
|8
|29/01/1957
|align=left| Houston, Texas
|align=left|
|-
|Win
|
|align=left| JD Marshall
|TKO
|2
|19/11/1956
|align=left| Tyler, Texas
|align=left|
|-
|Win
|
|align=left| Charley Norkus
|UD
|10
|02/10/1956
|align=left| Houston City Auditorium, Houston, Texas
|align=left|
|-
|Win
|
|align=left| Oscar Pharo
|PTS
|10
|27/08/1956
|align=left| Tyler, Texas
|align=left|
|-
|Win
|
|align=left| Calvin Butler
|PTS
|10
|30/05/1956
|align=left| Sam Houston Coliseum, Houston, Texas
|align=left|
|-
|Win
|
|align=left| "Chief" Alvin Williams
|UD
|10
|21/05/1956
|align=left| Tyler, Texas
|align=left|
|-
|Win
|
|align=left| Johnny Bullard
|KO
|4
|16/04/1956
|align=left| Tyler, Texas
|align=left|
|-
|Win
|
|align=left| Don Howard Tucker
|KO
|3
|20/02/1956
|align=left| Tyler, Texas
|align=left|
|-
|Win
|
|align=left| Ponce DeLeon Taylor
|PTS
|10
|13/12/1955
|align=left| Houston City Auditorium, Houston, Texas
|align=left|
|-
|Win
|
|align=left| Buddy Turman
|SD
|12
|28/11/1955
|align=left| Tyler, Texas
|align=left|
|-
|Win
|
|align=left| Fred Taylor
|PTS
|10
|01/11/1955
|align=left| Houston, Texas
|align=left|
|-
|Win
|
|align=left| Duke Smith
|KO
|3
|01/10/1955
|align=left| Tyler, Texas
|align=left|
|-
|Win
|
|align=left| LeJune Burks
|KO
|6
|30/09/1955
|align=left| Conroe, Texas
|align=left|
|-
|Win
|
|align=left| Dick Brown
|TKO
|3
|30/08/1955
|align=left| Sam Houston Coliseum, Houston, Texas
|align=left|
|-
|Win
|
|align=left|Chuck Connor
|KO
|2
|28/06/1955
|align=left| Sam Houston Coliseum, Houston, Texas
|align=left|
|-
|Win
|
|align=left| Bobby Watson
|PTS
|6
|14/06/1955
|align=left| LaGrave Field, Fort Worth, Texas
|align=left|
|-
|Win
|
|align=left| Ted Donald
|PTS
|8
|03/06/1955
|align=left| Conroe, Texas
|align=left|
|-
|Win
|
|align=left| JD Harvey
|PTS
|6
|03/05/1955
|align=left| Galveston City Auditorium, Galveston, Texas
|align=left|
|-
|Win
|
|align=left| Tommie Smith
|TKO
|3
|26/04/1955
|align=left| Sam Houston Coliseum, Houston, Texas
|align=left|
|}

Bibliography

References

External links
 

1933 births
Living people
Heavyweight boxers
Boxers from Texas
People from Montgomery County, Texas
Conroe High School alumni
American male boxers